John Alexander Fairley FRTS (born 15 April 1938) is a British former television producer from Yorkshire. With William Allison he wrote the 1978 book The Monocled Mutineer, made into a well-known 1986 BBC One controversial drama series, adapted by Alan Bleasdale.

Early life
He was born in Liverpool. He attended MerchantTaylor’s school in Crosby, Merseyside and then went to The Queen's College, Oxford.

Career

Newspapers
He started at the Bristol Evening Post in 1963, then went to the London Evening Standard in 1964.

Radio
From 1965-68 he was a radio producer with BBC Radio.

Yorkshire Television
He worked for Yorkshire Television (now ITV Yorkshire). He was a television producer from 1968-78. He became Managing Director of Yorkshire-Tyne Tees Television in 1993 until April 1995. He was replaced on 15 May 1995 by Bruce Gyngell, the former managing director from 1984-92 of TV-am.
During his employment at Yorkshire Television, he was the Producer of the cave diving documentary The Underground Eiger.

Publications
He has written books with Simon Welfare.
 The Monocled Mutineer, 1978, about the Étaples mutiny, written with William Allison

Personal life
He lives in North Yorkshire, in Eddlethorpe in Ryedale. He is married and has three daughters.

See also
 Ward Thomas (television executive), former chairman from 1993-97 of Yorkshire Television

References

External links
 Books
 IMDb

1938 births
Alumni of The Queen's College, Oxford
British radio producers
British television executives
British television producers
Channel 4 people
Fellows of the Royal Television Society
Horse racing mass media in the United Kingdom
ITV people
Mass media in Yorkshire
People from Ryedale (district)
Television personalities from Yorkshire
Living people